Fergnae or Fergno Britt mac Faílbi was the fourth abbot of Iona (605–623).  Fergnae was the first abbot of Iona to have come from outside Saint Columba's generation. Moreover, unlike his predecessors, he was not from the Cenél Conaill, the kin-group to which Columba belonged and he may also have been British and a bishop. Adomnán, in his Vita Columbae, says that he was 'a young man of good ability' and records that he witnessed one of Columba's miracles. Fergnae died in 623, and was succeeded by Ségéne.

References

Bibliography
 Sharpe, Richard, Adomnán of Iona: Life of St. Columba (London, 1995)

623 deaths
Abbots of Iona
6th-century Irish abbots
Year of birth unknown